Ethir Neechal (alternatively Ethirneechal, Edhirneechal or Edhir Neechal) may refer to:

 Edhir Neechal (1968 film)
 Ethir Neechal (2013 film)
 Ethir Neechal (soundtrack), of the 2013 film
 Ethirneechal (TV series)